Procera is a hypothetical clade of amphibians that includes salamanders and caecilians but not frogs. A close relationship between salamanders and caecilians is a competing hypothesis to the more widely supported view that salamanders and frogs are each other's closest relatives within a clade called Batrachia. Procera was proposed as a clade in 1998 and has been supported by few recent morphological and molecular studies.

References

Amphibians